Agosto is a Spanish surname. Notable people with the surname include:

 Benjamin Agosto, ice dancer
 Juan Agosto, pitcher
 Miguel Hernández Agosto, politician
 Victor Agosto, anti-war activist
 Fabricio Agosto Ramírez, goalkeeper

Spanish-language surnames
Surnames of Spanish origin